Ahmed Daniyal (born 3 July 1997) is a Pakistani cricketer. He made his Twenty20 debut on 21 February 2021, for Lahore Qalandars in the 2021 Pakistan Super League.

References

External links
 

1997 births
Living people
Pakistani cricketers
Lahore Qalandars cricketers
Place of birth missing (living people)
Melbourne Stars cricketers